The 2016 Scottish Women's Football League First Division, commonly known as SWFL 1, is the first season of the Scottish Women's Football League First Division, the third tier of women's football in Scotland since its reconstruction at the end of the 2015 season.

From this season the SWFL was split into two regional divisions of 12 teams each, North and South. The change was made to increase competitiveness in the league.

SWFL 1 North

Teams

Standings

Results

SWFL 1 South

Teams

Standings

Results

References

External links
Season at soccerway.com

1
Scot
Scot
Scottish Women's Football League seasons